Confrontation is a skirmish level tactical fantasy miniature wargaming in which the combatants are represented by metal or plastic figures in 28 mm scale. For comparison purposes, the system's figures are slightly larger than those of Games Workshop or The Foundry.

The game is set in Aarklash, a world of medieval fantasy where knights, wizards, priests and barbarians fight each other as well as fantastic creatures such as wolfen, elves, orcs, goblins and the undead. The entire world is at war and all are fighting for the supremacy of the continent.

The rules are intended to be versatile, and are able to represent a small fight between a handful of warriors just as well as a large skirmish between several dozen soldiers and their leaders. The last rules were in its fourth  edition, a single hardback edition. The first edition was only available in French, German and Italian,  while the second was available in French, German, Italian, English and Spanish. Rackham collapsed in 2010.

Playing the game
Each player in the game needs to acquire several miniatures to represent his forces. Miniatures are bought in blister packs, each containing one or more metal figures, a booklet of basic game rules, and a special reference card that describes the characteristics and special abilities of the game pieces. A photo or artist's drawing of the figures is on the reverse of the reference card, as a painting guide for the hobbyist.

Several six-sided dice and a table with scale scenery to play on are also needed.

Collecting

The Miniatures
Rackham originally produced metal miniatures for Confrontation in blisters of one to four models, or boxed sets of one to eight models.

Confrontation: Age of Ragnarok
With the release of "Confrontation: Age of Ragnarok", Rackham changed the supporting miniature line from unpainted metal figures to pre-painted plastic figures. This follows the production model used in "AT-43", their science fiction miniatures game.

The models were packaged in multiple figure sets that correspond with units and auxiliaries as described in the various army lists.

As of 2011, Legacy Miniatures Miniatures owns the rights to produce Confrontation miniatures & sells them via Cool Mini or Not.

The armies
 Akkylannie Griffons (Army of Light)
The Griffons are a fanatical army of humans that worship Merin, the God of Fire, spreading their truth through fire and sword.  
They have recently launched crusades throughout the land to find the body of their first ruler.  Despite their extreme methods they are devoted to driving back the forces of Darkness.  The Griffon army is characterized by heavily armored troops, high Discipline, strong ranged weapons, and powerful Faithful.  Their Magicians focus on Fire spells.
 Crusade of the Imperial Army
 Crusade of the Inquisition
 Crusade of the Lodge of Hod
 Crusade of the Eastern Temple
 Crusade of the Western Temple
 Crusade of the Northern Temple
 Crusade of the Southern Temple
 Alchemists of Dirz  (Army of Darkness)
The Scorpions of Dirz were founded by a high priest of Merin who was so consumed with attaining perfection that he began dark experiments combining man and science.  Fleeing the Inquisition, he and his followers fled to the desert, where they built hidden labs where they continue to create monstrous abominations and clone vat-born soldiers.  Dirz soldiers tend to have better attack stats with the possibility of boosting their abilities with their Mutagen.  Their Magicians focus on Darkness spells.
 Laboratory of Danakil
 Laboratory of Inuka
 Laboratory of Noctis Project
 Laboratory of S.O.78
 Laboratory of Shamir
 Laboratory of Tenseth
 Laboratory of Theben
 Cadwallon
 Guild of Architects
 Guild of Blades
 Guild of Ferrymen
 Guild of Goldsmiths
 Guild of Usurers
 Guild of Thieves
 Guild of Fortune-tellers
 Cynwäll  (Army of Light)
 Inheritance of the Ancients
 The Army of the Republic
 The Blade of Truth
 The Dragon of Light
 The Equanimes Monastery
 The Way of Trihedron
 Daïkinee of Quithayran  (Army of Destiny)
 Devourers of Vile-Tis  (Army of Destiny)
Wolfen who have separated from the rest of their race after Vile-Tis showed them the moon goddess Yllia had only contempt for her children. Focusing on their natural ferocity, The Beast twisted the Devourers from noble hunters into depraved killers. Devourers have high Movement, Resilience, and Defense with above average Strength making very dangerous and hard to kill. Their Magicians focus on Darkness spells.
 Revelation of Armageddon
 Revelation of Blasphemy
 Revelation of Carnage
 Revelation of The Eclipse
 Revelation of Ecstasy
 Revelation of The Impure
 Revelation of The Rebellion
 Dwarves of Mid-Nor (Army of Darkness)
 Colony of Vangghor
 Colony of Azahir
 Colony of Sabahal
 Colony of Kthan
 Colony of Sankunrun
 Colony of Ibenseth
 Colony of Ephorath
 Dwarves of Tir-Na-Bor  (Army of Light)
 Fom-Nur
 Kâ-In-Ar
 Kal-Nam
 Kar-An-Tyr
 Lor-An-Kor
 Naël-Tarn
 Ogh-Hen-Kir
 The brotherhood of bronze
 Goblins of No-Dan-Kar  (Army of Destiny)
 Uraken Goblins
 Black Rats Clan
 The Burrowers Clan
 The Chimes of Bronze Clan
 The Damned Swamp Clan
 Helldivers Clan
 The Mound of Dirt Clan
 The Thundering Bells Clan
 The X Clan
 Pirates a.k.a. Black Tooth
 Kelt Drunes (Army of Darkness)
A tribe of human barbarians dwell within the heart of a dark forest. They have rebelled against the gods and revel in killing and carnage. Their dark rites and cannibalism have led them to make pacts with the fearsome Formor demons and their Faithful can control dead warriors. Their Magicians focus on Elemental and Darkness spells.
 Scourge of Gwyrd-An-Caern
 Scourge of The Shadowy-One
 Scourge of The Red Scourge
 Scourge of The Horned Evil
 Scourge of Mount Silence
 Scourge of The Rag’narok
 Scourge of The Witches
 Kelt Sessairs  (Army of Light)
 Tribe of the Other world
 Tribe of Kel-An-Tiraidh
 Tribe of the Clan of the Crow
 Tribe of the Guardians of Scâth
 Tribe of the Horde of Murgan
 Tribe of the Wolves of Avagddu
 Lions of Alahan  (Army of Light)
 Barony of Algerande
 Barony of Allmoon
 Barony of Daneran
 Barony of Doriman
 Barony of Icquor
 Barony of Kalienne
 Barony of Laverne
 Barony of Luishana
 Barony of Manilla
 Living Dead of Acheron  (Army of Darkness)
 House Brisis
 House Hestia
 House Lazarian
 House Mantis
 House Sarlath
 House Tanit
 House Vanth
 Ophidian Alliance  (Army of Darkness)
 Orcs of Bran-O-Kor  (Army of Destiny)
 The Thunder Riders
 The Torches of Gerikân
 The Long Sun
 The Sarkaï Nomads
 The Vulture’s Claws
 Jackal’s Lair
 The Army of the Two Suns
 Wolfen of Yillia  (Army of Destiny)
 The Red Oaks
 The Twilight Hills
 The Wheel of Dreams
 The Path of Opal
 The Throne of Stars
 Elementals, Familiars and Immortals

Editions of the game

First edition

Confrontation can be played with the basic rules alone, but there are several supplements available. These describe optional rules and multiply the tactical options allowed. All are packed free in the appropriate blisters, just like the basic rules.

Incantation introduces powerful Wizards to the game. In this supplement a new characteristic appears: Mental Strength. Mental Strength is the essential element used to call upon the power of Magic. Wizards can use that power to change the course of battle: project fire balls, raise the dead and even invoke powerful spirits. Every blister that contains a Wizard includes a free Incantation Rules Booklet as well as cards that describe magic items and special spells particular to each. A small plate of counters representing 'Mana', the very essence of Magic, is also included. 'Grimoires,' packs of 15 additional spell cards, are available separately.

Incarnation allows players to individualize their game characters. Special 'Adventurer' figures are furnished with the Incarnation Rules Booklet which details how they progress in experience. The character acquires power, fame, new abilities and magic objects as he accomplishes  quests. Two new types of cards are packed in the Adventurer blisters: Scenarios and Experience Cards. Each Adventurer is furnished with a scenario specially written for him. Scenarios card packs are also available separately. Many scenarios based on the official characters of the range are available free on the Confrontation web site (in French). 'Travel Journals,' packs of cards for treasures, rare objects or magic artifacts, are available to further customize scenarios.

Second edition 

Divination addresses the gods themselves and their servants, the faithful Priests that represent them on the battlefields. The magic of the Priests is powerful but variable, for it depends on the vagaries of the fickle gods. It also tends to be more defensive in nature than Wizards' magic. The blisters of the Priests figures are packaged with the Divination Rules Booklet and several 'Miracle' cards to call upon the aid of the divine powers. The 'Litanies' card packs group together additional miracle cards.

Fortification adds in war machines such as cannon, ballista, and chariots. Some of the existing figures, such as the Dwarf Steam Cannon are reclassified to war machines.

Third edition

The third edition of Confrontation was issued as both basic rules, included in miniature blisters, and as a hardback bound advanced rules. The basic rules described combat and movement, but did not explain abilities or magic. The advanced rules included all rules from the second edition with some refinements in play.

One notable aspect of the third edition was its obsolescence of the adventure, spell, and miracle card packs. The reworked magic rules in the third edition significantly reduced the number of available spells by eliminating the previously released spell books. The book also includes an extensive section covering the changes to the existing model line and associated cards.

The unbalancing army cards were removed in this edition. Also removed was the declarable target number while making attack die rolls. Separate shooting and magic phases were also done away with. Now the round is based on only 4 phases with shooting taking place in the activation and magic being used throughout the round dictated by card text.

An on-line only revision was published within a year of the publication of the third edition. Called "Confrontation 3.5", this revision changed some abilities, reworked the line of sight rules, and changed the way spells and miracles were added to a force by removing points costs from them. This update also significantly changed the balance of ranged units by giving them the abilities "Bull's eye" and "Assault fire" and giving units that already had those abilities "cookies" to improve them.

Dogs of War was the only supplement for Confrontation, third edition.

Fourth edition

The fourth edition of Confrontation was named "Confrontation: Age of Ragnarok". This edition made major changes to the rules, including changing the game scope from single-model skirmish to small unit battle. As with second edition, Confrontation: Age of Ragnarok has re-issued the game cards to reflect the new rules and statistics.

Supplements

Dogs of War
"Dogs of War" was the supplement to Confrontation, third edition. It provides campaign rules that allow players to create small warbands that gain experience and improve as they are fielded in the games. These personalized warbands can be played in games of Confrontation or Rag'Narok, though they are not sanctioned for official tournaments.

In addition, Dogs of War includes expanded terrain rules, rules for Nexi, scenario rules, and rules for very large models, called Titans. Dogs of War is not suitable for earlier editions of the game.

Cry Havoc!
"Cry Havoc!", originally offered as a quarterly magazine, is available six times a year and is published by Rackham that includes information about its different games. The publication includes two magazines and new reference cards. The larger magazine has general articles on painting and modeling, as well as features on the games, tactics articles, battle reports, and background information on the world of Aarklash. The second magazine consists of play aids, variant rules, and scenarios. The reference cards supplement and augment the articles in the two magazines. These cards are not available separately.

Other related games

Rag'Narok
"Rag'Narok" is at once an evolution of the basic game and an entirely new one. Where the basic game represents small confrontations and skirmishes, in Rag'Narok entire armies are involved in battles.

Rag'Narok uses exactly the same basic resources as Confrontation (figures, cards and game characteristics), but the rules differ somewhat to accommodate the change in scope and keep the game manageable.

"Confrontation: Age of Ragnarok" is a melding of the earlier versions of Confrontation with Rag'narok.

Hybrid
"Hybrid" and its expansion "Nemesis" is a board game set in the world of Aarklash. The game is played on illustrated tiles arranged to form the floor plan of the underground laboratories of the Alchemists of Dirz. Players take the role of either the denizens of these laboratories or the outside forces invading them to either steal their secrets or shut them down. The rules of this subgame resemble Space Hulk somewhat.

The game uses a subset of the figures but with different reference cards.

Cadwallon

"Cadwallon" is a role-playing game dubbed a "Tactical role-playing game" set in Aarklash. It uses the same miniatures as other games in the Rackham line and illustrated tiles could be purchased on which to play.  The game was given its tactical prefix because of the in depth model centric combat.

Arcana
A card game set in the city of Cadwallon.

Cadwallon:City of Thieves
A fast paper board game developed by Rackham and released by Fantasy Flight Games.  Each player plays a gang of thieves and try to score highest thievery at the end of 'night'. An expansion named 'Cadwallon: City of Thieves - The King of Ashes' released for the game as well as some DLC by Fantasy Flight Games. 
A video game adaptation of the board game released by the same name for iPad and iPhone.

Guilds of Cadwallon
A tactical card and miniature game set in the city of Cadwallon, published by CoolMiniOrNot in 2013. The playing area consists of a 3x3 (or larger, depending on the number of players) grid of randomized cards, each representing a city district. Players compete for control of these districts with careful placement of their figures, and scoring is based on both the number of assets a player controls as well as how specialized those assets are in any given guild.

The Confederations
The Confederations  are a non-profit corporations set up in various countries to help expand the player base for Rackham's games. They work together as sister organizations, coordinating global tournaments and leagues. They also run tournaments, leagues, and demonstrations of the games in their own countries.

Membership in the confederations is open to anyone in their region. For an annual fee, a member has access to purchase exclusive Confederation miniatures as well as the ability to be ranked both nationally and internationally.

References

External links
 Confrontation Pills, The biggest portal for confrontation cards
 Legacy Miniatures at Cool Mini or Not
 The United Kingdom Conf'Federation of the Red Dragon (UKCORD)
 The Italian Ex Conf'Federation of the Red Dragon (CDRI). Now Confrontation Evo (CEVO)
 The Australia & New Zealand Confederation of the Red Dragon (ANZCORD)

Miniature wargames
Wargames introduced in the 1990s
hu:Confrontation
nl:Confrontation
pl:Confrontation
pt:Confrontation